Provincial elections were held in the Pakistani province of Punjab to elect the 14th Provincial Assembly of the Punjab on 10 October 2002, alongside nationwide general elections and three other provincial elections in Sindh, Balochistan and North-West Frontier Province. The remaining two territories of Pakistan, AJK and Gilgit-Baltistan, were ineligible to vote due to their disputed status. The elections were held under the military government of General Pervez Musharraf. The elections saw an end to the two-party system between the Pakistan Peoples Party and the Pakistan Muslim League (N), with the right-of-centre Pakistan Muslim League (Q) emerging as a third main party supporting Musharraf.

Results

References

Elections in Punjab, Pakistan
2002 elections in Pakistan